Dictyosphaerium pulchellum is a species of freshwater green algae, in the family Chlorellaceae.

Dictyosphaerium pulchellum is present in many plakes in southern Chile and Argentina including Lanalhue, Quillén, Lácar, and Nahuel Huapi. In this last lake it the dominant algae species in the winter halfyear.

References

External links

Chlorellaceae